The 1922 Kansas State Wildcats football team represented Kansas State Agricultural College in the 1922 college football season. The 1922 Wildcats finished with a record of 5–1–2 overall and a 3–1–2 mark in Missouri Valley Conference play.

The team's head coach was future College Football Hall of Famer Charlie Bachman.  The Wildcats played their home games in brand new Memorial Stadium, which opened that year.  Before the season started, Bachman arranged for a live wildcat to be kept on the sidelines of the new stadium as team mascot.  The wildcat was named "Touchdown," and the live mascot started a tradition that lasted over 50 years, until it was ended in the 1970s with the death of "Touchdown VIII."

At the conclusion of the season, guard Ray D. Hahn was named a first team All-American by Grantland Rice, becoming the first football player in school history to be so honored.

Schedule

References

Kansas State
Kansas State Wildcats football seasons
Kansas State Wildcats football